Joe or Joseph Hunter may refer to:

 Joseph Hunter (antiquarian) (1783–1861), English Unitarian Minister and antiquarian, historian of Sheffield and South Yorkshire

Music
 Joe Hunter (musician) (1927–2007), American pianist, member of the Funk Brothers
 Ivory Joe Hunter (1914–1974), American songwriter, singer and pianist
 Ivy Jo Hunter (1940), American record producer, singer and songwriter

Politics
 Joseph Hunter (Canadian politician) (1839–1935), member of the Legislative Assembly of British Columbia for Cariboo
 Joseph Douglas Hunter (1881–1970), Canadian politician in the Legislative Assembly of British Columbia
 Joseph Hunter (British politician) (1875–1935), Scottish politician, Liberal (later National Liberal) Member of Parliament (MP) 1929–1935

Sports
 Joe Hunter (cricketer) (1855–1891), English cricketer
 Joseph Hunter (rugby union) (1899–1984), American rugby union player